The German cockroach (Blattella germanica), colloquially known as the croton bug, is a species of small cockroach, typically about  long. In color it varies from tan to almost black, and it has two dark, roughly parallel, streaks on the pronotum running anteroposteriorly from behind the head to the base of the wings. Although B. germanica has wings, it can barely fly, although it may glide when disturbed. Of the few species of cockroach that are domestic pests, it probably is the most widely troublesome example. It is very closely related to the Asian cockroach, and to the casual observer, the two appear nearly identical and may be mistaken for each other. However, the Asian cockroach is attracted to light and can fly like a moth, while the German cockroach cannot.

Biology and pest status 
The German cockroach occurs widely in human buildings, but is particularly associated with restaurants, food processing facilities, hotels, and institutional establishments such as nursing homes and hospitals. They can survive outside as well, though they are not commonly found in the wild. In cold climates, they occur only near human dwellings, because they cannot survive severe cold. However, German cockroaches have been found as inquilines ("tenants") of human buildings as far north as Alert, Nunavut. Similarly, they have been found as far south as southern Patagonia.

Previously thought to be a native of Europe, the German cockroach later was considered to have emerged from the region of Ethiopia in Northeast Africa, but more recent evidence suggests that it actually originated in Southeast Asia. Whatever the truth of the matter, the cockroach's sensitivity to cold might reflect its origin from such warm climates, and its spread as a domiciliary pest since ancient times has resulted from incidental human transport and shelter. The species now is cosmopolitan in distribution, occurring as a household pest on all continents except Antarctica, and on many major islands, as well. It accordingly has been given various names in the cultures of many regions.

Though nocturnal, the German cockroach occasionally appears by day, especially if the population is crowded or has been disturbed. However, sightings are most frequent in the evening, when someone suddenly brings a light into a room deserted after dark, such as a kitchen where they have been scavenging. When excited or frightened, the species emits an unpleasant odor.

Diet 
German cockroaches are omnivorous scavengers. They are attracted particularly to meats, starches, sugars, and fatty foods. Where a shortage of foodstuff exists, they may eat household items such as soap, glue, and toothpaste. In famine conditions, they turn cannibalistic, chewing at each other's wings and legs. The German cockroach is an intermediate host of the Acanthocephalan parasite Moniliformis kalahariensis.

Reproduction 
The German cockroach reproduces faster than any other residential cockroach, growing from egg to reproductive adult in roughly 50 – 60 days under ideal conditions.  Once fertilized, a female German cockroach develops an ootheca in her abdomen. The abdomen swells as her eggs develop,  until the translucent tip of the ootheca begins to protrude from the end of her abdomen, and by that time the eggs inside are fully sized, about 1/4 inch long with 16 segments.  The ootheca, at first translucent, soon turns white and then within a few hours it turns pink, progressively darkening until, some 48 hours later, it attains the dark red-brown of the shell of a chestnut.  The ootheca has a keel-like ridge along the line where the young emerge, and curls slightly towards that edge as it completes its maturation.  A small percentage of the nymphs may hatch while the ootheca is still attached to the female, but the majority emerge some 24 hours after it has detached from the female's body.  The newly hatched 3-mm-long black nymphs then progress through six or seven instars before becoming sexually mature, but ecdysis is such a hazardous process that nearly half the nymphs die of natural causes before reaching adulthood.  Molted skins and dead nymphs are soon eaten by living nymphs present at the time of molting.

Pest control 
The German cockroach is very successful at establishing an ecological niche in buildings, and is resilient in the face of many pest-control measures. Reasons include:
 lack of natural predators in a human habitat
 prolific reproduction
 short reproductive cycle
 the ability to hide in very small refuges
 sexual maturity attained within several weeks, and
 adaptation and resistance to some chemical pesticides
German cockroaches are thigmotactic, meaning they prefer confined spaces, and they are small compared to other pest species, so they can hide within small cracks and crevices that are easy to overlook, thereby evading humans and their eradication efforts. Conversely, the seasoned pest controller is alert for cracks and crevices where it is likely to be profitable to place baits or spray surfaces.

To be effective, control measures must be comprehensive, sustained, and systematic; survival of just a few eggs is quite enough to regenerate a nearly exterminated pest population within a few generations, and recolonization from surrounding populations often is very rapid, too.

Another problem in controlling German cockroaches is the nature of their population behavior. Though they are not social and practice no organized maternal care, females carry oothecae of 18-50 eggs (average about 32) during incubation until just before hatching, instead of dropping them as most other species of cockroaches do. This protects the eggs from certain classes of predation. Then, after hatching, nymphs largely survive by consuming excretions and molts from adults, thereby establishing their own internal microbial populations and avoiding contact with most insecticidal surface treatments and baits.  One effective control is insect growth regulators (hydroprene, methoprene, etc.), which act by preventing molting, thus prevent maturation of the various instars.  Caulking baseboards and around pipes may prevent the travel of adults from one apartment to another within a building.

As an adaptive consequence of pest control by poisoned sugar baits, a strain of German cockroaches has emerged that reacts to glucose as distastefully bitter. They refuse to eat sweetened baits, which presents an obstacle to their control, given that baits are an economical and effective means of control. It also is a dramatic illustration of adaptive selection; in the absence of poisoned sweet baits, attraction to sugars strongly promotes growth, energy, and reproduction; cockroaches that are not attracted to sugars take longer to grow and reproduce, whereas in the presence of poisoned sugared baits, sugar avoidance promotes reproduction.

Comparison of three common cockroaches

Genome 
The genome of the German cockroach was published in February 2018 in Nature Ecology and Evolution. The relatively large genome (2.0 Gb) harbours a very high number of proteins, of which most notably one group of chemoreceptors, called the ionotropic receptors, is particularly numerous. These chemoreceptors possibly allow the German cockroach to detect a broad range of chemical cues from toxins, food, pathogens, and pheromones.

See also 
 Blattellaquinone, a sex pheromone of the German cockroach

Notes

References

External links 

 German cockroach on the UF / IFAS Featured Creatures Web site
 German cockroach fact sheet from the Penn State Extension

Cockroaches
Household pest insects
Insects described in 1767
Taxa named by Carl Linnaeus